Marconne dos Santos Montenegro (born 17 June 1974) is a Brazilian football manager, currently in charge of Horizonte.

Career
After starting his career in Fortaleza's youth schools, Montenegro joined the club's under-13 squad in 2014. He took over the under-17s in 2016, before being named an assistant of the under-20s in the following year.

In January 2018, Montenegro was named manager of the under-20 squad, replacing Totonho. In August of the following year, he was the interim manager of the main squad in a 2–0 Série A win against CSA, as Rogério Ceni left for Cruzeiro.

On 10 November 2020, as Ceni again left the club, Montenegro was again appointed interim.

References

External links

1974 births
Living people
Brazilian football managers
Campeonato Brasileiro Série A managers
Fortaleza Esporte Clube managers